Princess Luisa Cristina of Savoy (27 July 1629 – 12 May 1692) was a Princess of Savoy by birth and the eldest daughter of Victor Amadeus I, Duke of Savoy. She married her uncle Prince Maurice of Savoy but had no children. She was the owner of the future Villa della Regina. She was a first cousin of Louis XIV of France and Charles II of England.

Biography

Luisa Cristina was born at the Castello del Valentino in Turin. She was the eldest daughter of the future Victor Amadeus I, Duke of Savoy and his wife Christine Marie of France. Her birth was greeted with excitement as prior to her birth, her parents had lost a son and heir and were expecting another son. However, being a female and due to the Salic law, she was barred from succeeding to the Duchy of Savoy which at the time of her birth was ruled by her grandfather Charles Emmanuel I. Luisa Cristina was said to have been illegitimate and the fruit of her mother's supposed affair with a French courtier named "Pommeuse".

As a child, two of Luisa Cristina's brothers succeeded their father, who became ruler of Savoy in 1630. Her father died in 1637 and was succeeded quickly by her brother Francis Hyacinth who died in 1638 and was followed to the throne by another brother Charles Emmanuel II. Her mother, Christine Marie, took over as regent, a development which was disputed by  Luisa Cristina's uncles Thomas Francis, Prince of Carignano and Cardinal Maurice. The two brothers conspired against Christine Marie as regent, claiming the regency between the two of them. This led to a civil war in Savoy.

The war resulted in Thomas Francis and Maurice fleeing to Spain in the vain hope of finding  support. Luisa Cristina's mother was soon victorious in the ensuing wars thanks to French support in the form of her brother, Louis XIII. Returning to Savoy, Luisa Cristina was soon engaged to Maurice as part of a reconciliation between Christine Marie. Luisa Cristina married Maurice in Turin on 18 August 1642. Maurice had previously been a cardinal and had to receive permission from Pope Urban VIII who consented to the match. The thirteen-year-old bride and forty-nine-year-old Maurice moved to Nice where Maurice was the governor of the city – another part of the reconciliation.

Her husband died in 1657 of a stroke leaving Luisa Cristina a widow aged twenty seven. Her husband willed her his large art collection as well as his huge debts. In Turin she lived at her husband's villa outside Turin. She also did much to improve the structure under the direction of Amedeo di Castellamonte. She also commissioned Guarino Guarini to carry out works on churches in Savoy. Luisa Cristina died at the villa and left the property to her nephew's consort, the French born Anne Marie d'Orléans.

Ancestry

References

1629 births
1692 deaths
Nobility from Turin
Princesses of Savoy
17th-century Italian nobility
Italian people of French descent
Italian people of Hungarian descent
Italian people of Spanish descent
Italian people of Portuguese descent
Italian people of Polish descent
Italian people of English descent
Italian people of Austrian descent
Italian people of German descent
Daughters of monarchs